Chehalem is an  unincorporated community in Washington County, Oregon, United States, located southwest of Sherwood along Oregon Route 99W. The word "Chehalem" is a corruption of the Atfalati word "Chahelim," a name given in 1877 to one of the bands of Atfalati.

See also
 Chehalem Airpark
 Chehalem Elementary School
 Chehalem Mountains

References

Unincorporated communities in Washington County, Oregon
Unincorporated communities in Oregon
Oregon placenames of Native American origin